Page 6 (subtitled Atari Users Magazine and later known as Page 6 Atari User, then New Atari User) was an independent British publication aimed at users of Atari home computers. It was published between 1982 and 1998. The magazine supported both the Atari 8-bit family and later the Atari ST models.

History
The magazine had its origins in the newsletter of the Birmingham User's Group, an independent Atari club based in England. Les Ellingham was appointed to be the editor of the newsletter, but decided to produce a magazine with broader appeal instead. He remained editor of Page 6 throughout its entire run of 85 issues. Although subscription-only for most of its life, it was available through newsagents during the late 1980s and early 1990s.

When Database ceased publication of the original Atari User magazine in 1988, Page 6 bought the rights (and subscriber list), and renamed their magazine, firstly to Page 6 Atari User in February 1989 and then to New Atari User in June of the same year. The latter was simply Page 6 under a different (and more newsagent-friendly) name, and had next to no continuity with the original Atari User. The editor Les Ellingham had declined the offer to edit the original Atari User when approached by Database Publications in 1985.

Due to "high interest rate, reluctance of the news trade to support smaller circulation magazines and reducing advertising income", New Atari User had to be withdrawn from retail sales and become subscription-only with issue 59 (December-January 1993).

Title
The magazine was named after the area of memory in 8-bit Atari computers covering locations 1536–1791 (or $600–$6FF, where the "$" prefix indicates hexadecimal notation). Memory is divided into "pages" of 256 bytes (the first being page 0), making locations 1536 (256×6) to 1791 be "page 6." Page 6 memory is neither used by the operating system nor by Atari BASIC programs and so can be used to store the short machine code routines without them being overwritten.

References

External links
 Officially authorised Page 6/New Atari User website
 The Page 6 Magazine Library at the Centre for Computing History

1982 establishments in the United Kingdom
1998 disestablishments in the United Kingdom
Atari 8-bit computer magazines
Atari ST magazines
Bi-monthly magazines published in the United Kingdom
Video game magazines published in the United Kingdom
Defunct computer magazines published in the United Kingdom
Home computer magazines
Magazines established in 1982
Magazines disestablished in 1998
Mass media in Birmingham, West Midlands
Mass media in Staffordshire